Zuzana Černínová of Harasov) (25 September 1600 or 1601 – 22 February 1654 in Radenín) was a Czech noblewoman and letter writer.

Biography
Born on 25 September 1600 or 1601, Zuzana Černínová was born to Jiřík Homut of Harasov and Alžběta Cimburk from Choustník. In 1621 she married Jan Czernin of Chudenice (1597–1642), who was a member of the prominent Czernin family. They inherited a home in Nové Mitrovice from her husband's father. She had two sons Humprecht Jan Czernin and Herman Czernin of Chudenice, both of whom played significant roles in the Bohemian Reformation. She died on 22 February 1654 in Radenín and was buried at Church of Saint Margaret of Antioch, Kopčany.

Letters
Correspondence between z Harasova and her sons, which were first found and initially published in 1869, describe her experiences during Thirty Years' War (1618–48), and gives details about life of a noblewoman managing estates, enduring taxation, and dealing with plundering soldiers.

Legacy
The playwright Ladislav Stroupežnický made Zuzana Černínová the main character in his theatrical play Orphan's Money.

References

Sources
 Some content translated from corresponding Czech Wikipedia article
 BOROVSKÁ, Hana. Language and correspondence of Humprecht Jan Černín of Chudenice and Zuzana Černínová of Harasov. 1st ed. Brno: Masaryk University, 2013. 378 pp. Writings of the Faculty of Education, Masaryk University; St. No. 161. ISBN 978-80-210-6332-7.
 HOMUTOVÁ Z CIMBURKA, Alžběta, MYSLÍKOVNA Z CHUDENIC, Eliška and DVORSKÝ, František Ivan, ed. Mother and daughter of Zuzana Černínová from Harasov: letters from Alžběta Homutovna from Cimburk and Eliška Myslíkovna from Chuděnice. In Prague: F. Dvorský, 1890.
 ČERNÍNOVÁ Z HARASOVA, Zuzana. Letters of a Czech noblewoman from the middle of the 17th century. In Prague: Ed. Valečka, 1886.
 ČERNÍNOVÁ Z HARASOVA, Zuzana and KALISTA, Zdeněk, ed. Correspondence of Zuzana Černínová from Harasov with her son Humprecht Jan Černín from Chudenice. In Prague: Melantrich, 1941. online at citanka.cz

1654 deaths
Czech women writers
People from Tábor District
People from the Kingdom of Bohemia
17th-century Bohemian people
17th-century Bohemian writers
Czech-language writers